The Canim Lake Band (Shuswap language: Tsq'escen') is a First Nations government of the Secwepemc (Shuswap) Nation, located in the Central Interior region of the Canadian province of British Columbia.  Its main Indian reserve is located at Canim Lake, British Columbia, near 100 Mile House.  It was created when the government of the then-Colony of British Columbia established an Indian reserve system in the 1860s.  It is a member government of the Northern Shuswap Tribal Council.

The Canim Lake people are known in the Shuswap language as the Tsq'escenemc, "people of standing rock", while their community is known as Tsq'escen' ("standing rock")

The Canim Lake Band has not signed any treaty with any settler-colonial political entity, nor has it ceded any land and let go its territorial claims. As part of the Northern Secwepemc te Qelmucw (Tribal Council), Canim Lake Band has been in negotiation with the government of Canada and the government of British Columbia regarding a final treaty settling this matter. An "Agreement in Principle" was signed in 2018. Once a final agreement is signed between the Tribal Council, Canada, and British Columbia, it is expected that the Indian Reserves will be abolished, the territories under jurisdiction of Canim Band will expand significantly, and former reserves will be absorbed into settlement land under sovereignty of Canim Lake Band.

Reserves
Canim Lake band has the following 5 Indian Reserves under its jurisdiction. As explained before, these reserves were unilaterally defined by the Government of British Columbia, and thus the Band has never retracted its claim on its territory. These reserves are expected to be abolished and absorbed into settlement lands, after the signing of a final agreement.

 Canim Lake 1 - 4400 Acres
 Canim Lake 2 - 160 Acres
 Canim Lake 3 - 40 Acres
 Canim Lake 4 - 40 Acres
 Canim Lake 5 - 148 Acres
 Canim Lake 6 - 40 Acres

See also

Northern Shuswap Tribal Council
Canim Lake, British Columbia

References

External links

Canim Lake Band website
Northern Shuswap Tribal Council website
Shuswap Nation website

Secwepemc governments
Cariboo